Cornelis Giles (in Dutch: Cornelis Cornelisz. Gielis;  – 2 July 1722) was a Dutch whaler, navigator, cartographer, and polar explorer.

Life 
As a whaler in 1707, Giles traveled north of Nordaustlandet in Svalbard, and managed to reach a degree farther north of Sjuøyane without encountering ice. A published abstract in the Royal Geographical Society's proceedings remarked in 1873 that such voyages "have never been equalled  up to the present day".

He then continued his route eastward in an open sea and sighted an unknown high land at 80 degrees north—the island of Kvitøya—which would not be seen again until 1876. The location appeared on charts as "Giles Land" for a number of years, and it was visited for an exploration in 1898 by Alfred Gabriel Nathorst.

Somehow hence, the island came to be considered mythical—as late as 1935—when an expedition by Georgy Ushakov in the icebreaker  was described in the news as seeking "a phantom island" or "the alleged island" of Giles Island.

Giles died at sea on 2 July 1722, and was buried in Den Helder on 19 August. The Gilessundet inlet in Svalbard was named in his honor.

References

Further reading 
 Michel d'Arcangues, Dictionary of pole explorers, Séguier, 2002, p. 223.

18th-century Dutch cartographers
18th-century Dutch explorers
1670s births
1722 deaths
Dutch polar explorers
Navigators
People from Den Helder
People in whaling